Peter Featherby (born 12 December 1951) is a former Australian rules footballer.  He began his senior career with Subiaco Football Club in the West Australian Football League (WAFL), but he also played with two Victorian Football League (VFL) clubs.

Featherby's first stint in the VFL was with the Footscray Football Club, where he lasted only two seasons before moving back to Subiaco.

Geelong encouraged him to return to the VFL in 1979 he moved to the club and won the Carji Greeves Medal in 1981. A prolific ball-winner, he had the second highest confirmed possession game of all time, gathering 43 kicks, 8 handballs and 12 marks against Melbourne in round 16, 1981. Other unconfirmed reports say Featherby amassed 55 possessions for Footscray in 1975 and 56 against Fitzroy in 1983. Featherby left VFL football in 1983, but continued to play for Subiaco for the next five seasons, including in their 1986 premiership side, 13 years after his first premiership.

He also played 15 interstate matches, 14 for Western Australia and one for Victoria in 1980.  He was inducted into the West Australian Football Hall of Fame and named as Subiaco's Legend in 2007.

References

External links

1951 births
Living people
Carji Greeves Medal winners
Geelong Football Club players
Subiaco Football Club players
Western Bulldogs players
Victorian State of Origin players
Western Australian State of Origin players
Australian rules footballers from Western Australia
West Australian Football Hall of Fame inductees